Dilip Barooah (5 August 1957 - 19 August 2020) was an Assamese author and Social Entrepreneur who is credited to be the pioneer of manufacturing of Eri Silk in the North East of India.

Publications 

 South Asian Ways of Silk: A Patchwork of Biology, Manufacture, Culture and History  
 Indian ways of silk : precious threads bridging India's past, present and future 
Understanding Morphology, next to Skin Comfort, and Change of Properties during Washing of Knitted Blends of Eri Silk

Early life and career 
Dilip Barooah was born August 5, 1957, in Margherita, Assam, in northeastern India. Dilip studied at the Assam Textiles Institute. In the early eighties he worked at a textile mill in Mumbai as a manager and then moved to Germany and South Africa. He came back to Assam to advance the industrial growth supported by the government of Assam. 

Barooah founded Fabric Plus Pvt Ltd in Mumbai in 2003.Adding value to local raw materials with innovation had Fabric Plus catering to fashion giants like Armani, Hugo Boss, Just Cavalli, Chopard and Moschino among other brands. As a social entrepreneur for Chhaygaon,  Barooah helped the region’s growth. The Eri silk spinning mill impacted the lives of 350 spinners and weavers and benefitted 4,500 people engaged in producing silk/cocoon and marketing. Barooah played a significant role in redefining the term "sustainable silk" and its "authenticity".

Up-cycling of reeling waste from Muga silk was a new process introduced by Dilip. By up-cycling the waste procured from the silk reeling process, Dilip was able to convert them back into yarns. This practice was the first achievement of its kind with Muga silk.

Dilip also established Rudrasagar Silk Ltd with the help of the Textile Ministry of India to produce High quality Eri and Muga Silk.

Awards/Recognition 

 Indira Gandhi Priyadarshini Award
 True Legends Awards 2016 Northeast

Death 
Dilip Barooah died on 19 August 2020 at around 11:30 pm due to COVID-19 related complications.

References 

Businesspeople from Assam
People from Tinsukia district
1957 births
2020 deaths
Deaths from the COVID-19 pandemic in India